Gregor Meyle (born 13 October 1978) is a German singer-songwriter. He first rose to prominence when he auditioned for the talent contest TV Total, hosted in Stefan Raab's late-night-show TV total in late-2007, eventually finishing in second place behind Stefanie Heinzmann.

Meyle achieved even more public recognition when he participated in the reality television series Sing meinen Song – Das Tauschkonzert in 2014, the German version of The Best Singers series. In April 2020, Meyle was infected with Severe acute respiratory syndrome coronavirus 2 (SARS‑CoV‑2). This led to a two-week interruption of the German show The Masked Singer, in which Meyle was a contestant.

Discography

Studio albums

References

External links

Official website

1978 births
German male  singer-songwriters
Living people
21st-century German  male  singers